Tythan Franco Adams (born ) is a South African rugby union player for  in the Currie Cup and the Rugby Challenge. His regular position is wing.

References

South African rugby union players
Living people
1990 births
People from Saldanha Bay Local Municipality
Rugby union wings
Boland Cavaliers players
Griquas (rugby union) players
Sharks (Currie Cup) players
SWD Eagles players
Rugby union players from the Western Cape